The 208th Infantry Division, or 208.Infanterie-Division in German, was a large military unit that served during World War II. Like most German infantry divisions, the bulk of its troops were foot-mobile infantry supported by horse-drawn artillery.

The 208th Infantry Division was formed on 26 August 1939. it served in the invasion of Poland of 1939 as a reserve division of Army Group North and was commanded by General Moritz Andreas. During Fall Gelb it was a reserve division allocated to 18th Army and was mainly active in the occupation of northern Belgium. From January 1942 it fought continuously on the Eastern Front.

Commanding officers
Generalleutnant Moritz Andreas, (1 September 1939 – 13 December 1941)
General der Infanterie Hans-Karl von Scheele, (13 December 1941 – 1 February 1943)
Generalleutnant Karl-Wilhelm von Schlieben, (1 February 1943 – ? April 1943)
Generalmajor Georg Zwade, (? April 1943 – 22 June 1943)
Generalleutnant Heinz Piekenbrock, (22 June 1943 – 8 May 1945)

Order of battle

1939 

 Infantry Regiment 309
 Infantry Regiment 337
 Infantry Regiment 338
 Artillery Regiment 208
 Engineer Battalion 208
 Anti-Tank Detachment 208
 Reconnaissance Detachment 208
 Intelligence Department 208
 Supply Troops 208

1943 

 Grenadier Regiment 309
 Grenadier Regiment 337
 Grenadier Regiment 338
 Fusilier Battalion 208
 Artillery Regiment 208
 Pioneer Battalion 208
 Panzerjäger Detachment 208
 Intelligence Department 208
 Supply Troops 208

See also
 German order of battle for Operation Fall Weiss
 List of German Divisions in World War II

Infantry divisions of Germany during World War II
Military units and formations established in 1939
1939 establishments in Germany
Military units and formations disestablished in 1945